Turkey, officially the Republic of Turkey is a transcontinental parliamentary republic in Eurasia, mainly on the Anatolian peninsula in Western Asia, with a smaller portion on the Balkan peninsula in Southeast Europe. Turkey is a democratic, secular, unitary, constitutional republic with a diverse cultural heritage. 

The country has an emerging market economy as defined by the IMF. Turkey is among the world's developed countries according to the CIA World Factbook. Turkey is also defined by economists and political scientists as one of the world's newly industrialized countries. Turkey has the world's 18th largest nominal GDP, and 15th largest GDP by PPP. The country is among the world's leading producers of agricultural products; textiles; motor vehicles, ships and other transportation equipment; construction materials; consumer electronics and home appliances.

For further information on the types of business entities in this country and their abbreviations, see "Business entities in Turkey".

Largest firms 
This list shows firms in the Fortune Global 500, which ranks firms by total revenues reported before 31 March 2017. Only the top five firms (if available) are included as a sample.

Notable firms 
This list includes notable companies with primary headquarters located in the country. The industry and sector follow the Industry Classification Benchmark taxonomy. Organizations which have ceased operations are included and noted as defunct.

See also
 Economy of Turkey

References 

Turkey